Live at The Basement is Rock band Brother Henry's first live album.  

Live at The Basement was recorded Halloween weekend, 2004 to cap off Brother Henry's 2004 tour.  The album features songs from their first two studio albums, Come On, People and Chasing Happiness.  The album also features Brother Henry's version of the Bee Gee's hit "Staying Alive".

Track listing
"Opening Up" - 4:46
"Return To Me"  - 3:20
"Fab Four" - 3:01
"Love Is Moving Through This World" - 3:24
"Two Old Friends" - 4:34
"Over My Head" - 4:01
"Last Plateau" - 4:33
"Don't Give Up" - 3:03
"Bad Dog" - 3:12
"Staying Alive" - 4:24
"Wonderful As You" - 5:02

Brother Henry albums
2005 live albums